A ball and chain is a physical restraint device historically applied to prisoners, primarily in the British Empire and its former colonies, from the 17th century until as late as the mid-20th century. A type of shackle, the ball and chain is designed so that the weight of the iron ball at the end of the short chain restricts and limits the pace at which its wearer is able to move, making any attempt at escape much more difficult.

See also

Electronic tagging

References

Physical restraint
Iron objects